Birger Rygg Kaada (11 July 1918 – 30 January 2000) was a Norwegian physician and neurophysiologist.

Kaada was born in Jørpeland to merchant Theodor Kaada and Anna Rygg. He established the institution Nevrofysiologisk laboratorium in 1950, and was appointed professor of neurophysiology at the University of Oslo from 1959.

References

1918 births
2000 deaths
People from Strand, Norway
Norwegian neuroscientists
Neurophysiologists
Academic staff of the University of Oslo
Members of the Norwegian Academy of Science and Letters